René Flenghi (born 7 January 1949) is a Luxembourgian former footballer. A defender, he played for the Luxembourg national football team and Red Boys Differdange. He also worked for ARBED.

Honours
Luxembourg Cup: 1
 1971–72

References

1949 births
Living people
Luxembourgian footballers
FA Red Boys Differdange players
Luxembourg international footballers
Association football defenders